Running Scared is a 1980 action/adventure film directed by Paul Glickler, starring Ken Wahl and Judge Reinhold, and introducing Annie McEnroe.

Plot
The film takes place in April 1961, prior to the proposed Bay of Pigs Invasion. Two soldiers, LeRoy Beecher (Judge Reinhold) and Chaz McClain (Ken Wahl), are just finishing a two-year Infantry tour in the Army in Panama. They hitch a ride on a military C-47 back to their home state, Florida after bribing the pilot with a gift of LP records. LeRoy has stolen a footlocker full of surveillance equipment in-particular an infra-red camera (punishable with time in Leavenworth). During the flight to Florida the plane makes a brief stopover on some secret Caribbean island base. While at the island LeRoy, goofing around, unwittingly uses the infra-red camera to take photographs of the base and of Chaz (thereby identifying him). He leaves the tear-off part of the negative on the C-47's floor. The plane then continues to Florida, where Leroy and Chaz disembark and workers (presumably anti-castrist Cubans) sweep up the aircraft and find LeRoy's camera tear-off. The workers take the negative to two superiors (John Saxon and Bradford Dillman), who are planning an invasion of Cuba from the secret island base. They develop LeRoy's negatives and now can visually identify Chaz.

The anti-Castrists know the plane was heading to Florida and now think that LeRoy and Chaz are spies sent to give away the secret of the island base and presumed invasion. Saxon and Dillman assemble a large number of armed men and proceed to search for and locate LeRoy and Chaz throughout the Florida Everglades. When Chaz and LeRoy return home they try to re-adjust to civilian life. They thumb a ride with a teenage boy who is on his way to school and drives a souped-up hot rod car. The boy, who has fantasies of joining the army himself, gives Chaz and LeRoy a crazy high-speed ride through the back country, dropping them off in town.

Afterward, they go to a diner where the latest music Del Shannon ("Runaway") and Ronnie Dawson ("Decided By The Angels") is playing on a jukebox and they encounter two young high school girls with a station wagon. One of the teenage girls shows LeRoy a new dance called The Twist. The boys go to a secluded spot with the girls and "score" with the girls before they go off to school. However, the boys have not been off the plane for long before Saxon's armed men, having identified them in the diner, are chasing and shooting at them in the night. LeRoy makes it out of the first ambush and gets back to his parents' home. Chaz loses contact with him but survives the ambush.

The next morning Chaz is searching for LeRoy when a fancy convertible driven by an attractive, rich young woman named Sallie Mae stops to give him a lift. She at first refuses to take Chaz to LeRoy's parents' house, and he threatens to cut up her car seats with a razor blade if she abandons him on the road. Sallie Mae consents to take Chaz to LeRoy's parents' house deep in the Everglades swamp, where her car breaks down in the driveway. LeRoy, Chaz and Sallie Mae are reunited. It is revealed that LeRoy's father "Pa" Beecher (Lonny Chapman) runs an illegal moonshine operation. The Beechers, Pa and Ma, have been out shopping and return to encounter Chaz and Sallie Mae who helps Ma Beecher with the groceries. Pa Beecher's temper hits the roof when he sees Sallie Mae's broken down convertible in the driveway, as it easily gives away the location of his home and that he's running an illegal liquor operation. The soldiers track Chaz and LeRoy to LeRoys' parents' home after spotting Sallie Mae's car.

A shootout occurs at the Beecher home. Pa Beecher is angry that his moonshine secret is out, and curses his son LeRoy. LeRoy, along with Chaz and Sallie Mae, steal one of Mister Beecher's airboats and an exciting long chase continues through the swamp. Chaz later returns to his own father's (Pat Hingle) house and encounters his old girlfriend Robin. Robin, seeing Sallie Mae, thinks that Chaz has impregnated Sallie Mae. Sallie Mae also returns with Chaz to her parents' (who are vacationing in Europe) palatial estate and the two clean themselves up. After much adventure eluding Saxon, Dillman and their men, LeRoy and Chaz eventually overcome them. A romance has developed between Chaz and the wealthy Sallie Mae.

Notes
This film is known under several titles for home media, cable TV and foreign market, including Desperate Men, Back in the USA, Auf Teufel Komm Raus (German), Panische Flucht (German). Once readily available on cable and videotape, it can be streamed for a fee on Youtube and Amazon.

Lonny Chapman who plays Pa Beecher was a cast member of a 1961-62 tv show The Everglades which starred Ron Hayes and featured the use of airboats.

Home media
The film was released on DVD (and later on Blu-Ray) on September 26, 2017 from CodeRed video. Paul Glickler provides an audio-commentary throughout.

Cast
Judge Reinhold as LeRoy Beecher
Ken Wahl as Chaz McClain
Annie McEnroe as Sally Mae Giddens
Bradford Dillman as Arthur Jaeger
John Saxon as Captain Munoz
Pat Hingle as Sergeant McClain
Lonny Chapman as Pa Beecher (*billed as Lonnie Chapman)
Tom McFadden as Colonel Williams
Tim Brantly as Kid in Jalopy
Mary Lawson as Ponytail
Lisa Felcoski as Sandy
Francine Joyce as Robin Winston
Malcolm Jones as Storekeeper
Tom Tully as Pilot of C-47
Roger Pretto as Commando Lieutenant

External links 
 
 
  Running Scared; kinotv.com
  EVERGLADES (1961) starring Ron Hayes
 opening sequences "Everglades" w/Ron Hayes

References

1980 films
1980s action adventure films
American spy films
Films set in 1961
Films set in Florida
American action adventure films
1980s spy films
1980s English-language films
Films with screenplays by David Odell
1980s American films